Buchpora is a town on the outskirts of Srinagar, Jammu and Kashmir, India. It is situated on Srinagar-Leh Highway on the eastern side of Anchar Lake. The postal code of the area is 190020.
Most of the current inhabitants of the area are migrants from Downtown Srinagar. During the project of widening the roads in Downtown, numerous houses obstructing the widening of roads were shattered down. The homeless people were given plots of land by state government in neighbouring areas including Buchpora and Soura. Thus government housing colonies were constructed in these areas. there are many areas adjacent to this area, Illahi bagh, Rang pora, Umerhaira, are some of them. The area was an agriculture land but has been converted into a residential area.

The area provides two major road links which connect Ganderbal with Srinagar.

Schools
The schools providing education facilities to local students as well as the students from other districts are as follows :
 Green Valley Educational Institute
 Saint Solomon High School
 Snow Land Public School 
 Zulfikar Memorial Educational Institute
 Usmania  Model High School
 Oasis Preparatory School

See also
 90 Feet Road
 Soura

References

Cities and towns in Srinagar district
Jammu and Kashmir
Srinagar district
Srinagar
Neighbourhoods in Srinagar